Sjoerd Hoogendoorn (February 17, 1991 Nieuwegein) is a Dutch volleyballplayer, currently playing for Italian Sir Safety Umbria Volley and a Netherlands men's national volleyball team member.

Career 
Hoogendoorn played for the Dutch club Dynamo Apeldoorn between 2009 and 2013. During this period he won the National Championship, the SuperCup and twice the National Cup.

In 2013 Hoogendoorn continued his career in Finland at Vammalan Lentopallo who are acting in the Finland Volleyball League. He won the Finnish Championship and was twice runner up champion of the National Cup.

During the 2015/2016 season Hoogendoorn played for the Italian team Globo Banca del Popolare Frusinate Sora, or Argos Volley. In February 2016 Sora lost the Cup final in the Mediolanum Forum in Milan with 3-2 from Vibo Valentia. Sora managed to win the A2 championship against the same opponent with 3–2 in the best-of-5 play-off series, after trailing 0–2. The last game on 15-05-2016, played in Vibo Valentia, was won by Sora with 3–1. This earned promotion to the Superlega, the Serie A1, for Sora, for the first time in their history.

During the seasons 2016/2017 and 2017/2018 Hoogendoorn played for the Italian team Olimpia Pallovolo in the Serie A2 Championship. During season 2017/2018 Hoogendoorn was captain of the team.

Currently Hoogendoorn plays for the Italian Serie A1 team Sir Safety Umbria Volley who won the Italian Championship, the Italian Cup and the Italian SuperCup in season 2017–2018. This season Sir Safety Umbria Volley won the Italian Cup of the Serie A1 in February 2018 at the Unipol Arena in Bologna.

National team 
Hoogendoorn is a member of the Netherlands men's national volleyball team since 2011. In 2010 he was captain of the Junior National team and he became 'Best Scorer' at the Junior European Championship in Babruisk, Belarus.

Sporting achievements
 2009/2010  Dutch Cup, with Dynamo Apeldoorn
 2009/2010  Dutch Championship, with Dynamo Apeldoorn
 2010/2011  Dutch SuperCup, with Dynamo Apeldoorn
 2010/2011  Dutch Cup, with Dynamo Apeldoorn
 2013/2014  Finnish Championship, with Vammalan Lentopallo
 2015/2016  Italian Championship Serie A2, with Argos Sora
 2018/2019  Italian Cup, Serie A1, with Sir Safety Umbria Volley
 2019/2020  Italian Supercup, Serie A1, with Sir Safety Umbria Volley

National team - Golden League 2019 3rd place

Individually
 2010 CEV U21 European Championship – Best Scorer
 2016/2017 Best Scorer A2  744 points
 2019/2020 Best player of Sir Safety Perugia 2019/2020, voted by fans

References 

1991 births
Living people
People from Nieuwegein
Dutch men's volleyball players
Expatriate volleyball players in Finland
Expatriate volleyball players in Italy
Sportspeople from Utrecht (province)